"Mother" is a song by American singer-songwriter Charlie Puth. It was released through Artist Partner Group and Atlantic Records as a single on September 12, 2019. Puth produced the song with Louis Bell and Andrew Watt, and they wrote it alongside Ryan Tedder and Billy Walsh. Billboard ranked it as the 74th best song of 2019.

Background
Puth revealed the song's title and release date on September 4, 2019. "Mother" was written and produced by Puth, Andrew Watt, Louis Bell and Ryan Tedder. According to Puth, the song is about a relationship that is "secretly crumbling from the inside", and that he "sometimes disguise sad lyrical sentiments with happy music".

The song and its video were released on September 12, 2019.

Charts

Release history

References

2019 singles
2019 songs
Charlie Puth songs
Atlantic Records singles
Song recordings produced by Louis Bell
Songs written by Charlie Puth
Songs written by Ryan Tedder
Songs written by Andrew Watt (record producer)
Songs written by Louis Bell